Nick Kouparitsas (born ) is a former Greek international rugby league footballer who played in the 2000s and 2010s. A Greece international representative , he played for Canterbury-Bankstown, Sydney Roosters and Harlequins RL.

Background
Kouparitsas was born in Canberra, Australian Capital Territory, Australia.

Playing career
While attending Daramalan College, Canberra, Kouparitsas played for the Australian Schoolboys team in 2001.

Kouparitsas made his NRL début for Canterbury-Bankstown in 2006, making three NRL appearances in 2006. Kouparitsas became a regular part of the Canterbury first grade team in 2007. Kouparitsas scored his first NRL try on 22 June 2007 against Manly at Brookvale Oval. 

In 2009, Kouparitsas spent the beginning of the season playing NSW Cup for Bulldogs' feeder club, the Bankstown City Bulls. As a result of not playing first grade, a release was sought from Canterbury and Kouparitsas signed with the Sydney Roosters prior to round 8. The deal was meant to go ahead weeks earlier, but Canterbury pulled out of the deal. At the conclusion of the 2009 season, Kouparitsas played in two consecutive wooden spoon teams (Canterbury in 2008 and then the Sydney Roosters in 2009). In 2010 he played 24 games mainly starting at hooker or second row where the roosters made the 2010 Nrl Grand Final losing 32-8 to the St. George Illawarra Dragons. This is the highlights of Nicks career. Kouparitsas joined English club Harlequins on a one-year deal for the 2011 Engage Super League season.

Representative career
At an international level, Kouparitsas played for Greece in 2005 in a friendly match against Malta. He also took part in the historic first Rugby League match to take place in Greece, which was played in Athens on 28 October 2006. Greece beat Serbia 44–26, in a match that featured Michael Korkidas, who captained Greece.

Post playing
Kouparitsas is now a real estate agent in Queensland.

References

External links
 Sydney Roosters profile
 Bulldogs Profile

1984 births
Living people
Australian people of Greek descent
Australian rugby league players
Australian expatriate sportspeople in England
Canterbury-Bankstown Bulldogs players
Greece national rugby league team players
Greek expatriate sportspeople in England
London Broncos players
People educated at Daramalan College
Rugby league hookers
Rugby league locks
Rugby league players from Canberra
Rugby league second-rows
Sydney Roosters players